Wen Qin (died February or March 258), courtesy name Zhongruo, was a Chinese military general and politician of the state of Cao Wei during the Three Kingdoms period of China. 

Wen Qin was a son of Wen Ji (文稷), a general who served under Cao Cao. In September or October 219, during Wei Feng's rebellion, Wen Qin was implicated and imprisoned. Wen Qin was flogged a few hundred times and was supposed to be executed, but Cao Cao spared him on his father's account.

He served as the Inspector of Yang Province during the reign of the third Wei emperor, Cao Fang. In 254, when the Wei regent Sima Shi, who effectively controlled the Wei government, deposed Cao Fang and replaced him with Cao Mao, Wen Qin was deeply displeased because his loyalty was to the Wei emperor and not the Sima family. In the following year, he and another Wei general, Guanqiu Jian, started a rebellion in Shouchun (present-day Shou County, Anhui) against Sima Shi. However, Sima Shi managed to suppress the rebellion within months; Guanqiu Jian was killed while Wen Qin and his family escaped and defected to Wei's rival state, Eastern Wu. In 257, when another Wei general Zhuge Dan started a rebellion in Shouchun against the Wei regent Sima Zhao (Sima Shi's brother and successor), Wen Qin and some Wu forces came to Shouchun to support Zhuge Dan. Sima Zhao led Wei forces to besiege Shouchun and the siege dragged on until early 258. As the situation became more dire, relations between Wen Qin and Zhuge Dan deteriorated, especially since they did not trust each other before. Zhuge Dan eventually had Wen Qin executed. Wen Qin's sons, Wen Yang and Wen Hu, fled from Shouchun and surrendered to Sima Zhao.

See also
 Lists of people of the Three Kingdoms

Notes

References

 Chen, Shou (3rd century). Records of the Three Kingdoms (Sanguozhi).
 Pei, Songzhi (5th century). Annotations to Records of the Three Kingdoms (Sanguozhi zhu).

Year of birth unknown
258 deaths
Cao Wei generals
Eastern Wu generals
Executed Eastern Wu people
Political office-holders in Anhui
Three Rebellions in Shouchun